Artyom, also spelled Artem, is a Slavic male given name.

It may also refer to:
Artyom, Azerbaijan, a town in Azerbaijan
Artyom, Russia, a town in Primorsky Krai, Russia
Artem Island, alternative name of Pirallahi Island in the Caspian Sea

See also
Artemis (disambiguation)